Tutufa oyamai is a species of sea snail, a marine gastropod mollusk in the family Bursidae, the frog shells.

Description

Distribution

References

External links

Bursidae
Gastropods described in 1973